Buffalo Airport may refer to:

 Buffalo Niagara International Airport, serving Buffalo, New York, United States, and the busiest airport in the Buffalo area
 Buffalo Airfield, serving West Seneca, New York, United States
 Buffalo-Lancaster Airport, serving Lancaster, New York, United States
 North Buffalo Suburban Airport, serving Lockport, New York, United States
 Buffalo Airport (Texas) in Amarillo, Texas, United States

See also
Buffalo Municipal Airport (disambiguation)